Garzigliana is a comune (municipality) in the Metropolitan City of Turin in the Italian region Piedmont, located about  southwest of Turin.

Garzigliana borders the following municipalities: Pinerolo, Osasco, Macello, Bricherasio, and Cavour.

References

Cities and towns in Piedmont